Brigitte Auber (born Marie-Claire Cahen de Labzac , 27 April 1925) is a French actress who has worked on stage, film and television in Europe.

Career
Auber was born in Paris on 27 April 1925. She began her film career with the leading role in Jacques Becker's Rendezvous in July (1949) and was known for roles in French films of the 1950s, including Julien Duvivier's romance Under the Sky of Paris (1951). Auber played the role of Danielle Foussard  opposite Cary Grant and Grace Kelly in Alfred Hitchcock's To Catch a Thief, released in 1955. 

In 1957 she was in a relationship with Alain Delon for a few months; they lived together in Paris. On the occasion of the 1957 Cannes Film Festival, she went with him to the French Riviera. In Cannes, Delon became friends with Jean-Claude Brialy and came into contact with the film industry, meeting his future agent George Beaume there, and was spotted by Henry Willson responsible for recruiting new talents on behalf of David O. Selznick.

Nearly a decade and a half later, Auber played the part of the elder Françoise in Claude de Givrays miniseries Mauregard (1969). The young Françoise was played by another French Hitchcock actress, Claude Jade from Topaz.  She also had a supporting role in The Man in the Iron Mask, the 1998 film adaptation of the novel The Vicomte of Bragelonne: Ten Years Later by Alexandre Dumas. Leonardo DiCaprio played Louis XIV of France and his twin, the Man in the Iron Mask, while Auber played the Queen mother's attendant.

Selected filmography

References

External links
 

1925 births
Living people
20th-century French actresses
Actresses from Paris
French film actresses
French television actresses
Signatories of the 1971 Manifesto of the 343